Pornography (often shortened to porn or porno) has been defined as sexual subject material "such as a picture, video, or text," that is primarily intended to assist sexual arousal in the consumer, and is created and commercialized with ″the consent of all persons involved.″ Indicated for the consumption by adults, pornography depictions have evolved from cave paintings, some forty millenia ago, to virtual reality presentations in modern-day. Pornography use is considered a widespread recreational activity among people inline with other digitally mediated activities such as use of social media or video games. A distinction is often made regarding adult content as whether to classify it as pornography or erotica.

Depictions of a sexual nature have existed since the times of  prehistory. The oldest artifacts that are considered pornographic were discovered in Germany in 2008 CE which are dated to be at least 35,000 years old. Throughout the history of erotic depictions, various groups within society have considered them to be noxious and made attempts to suppress them under obscenity laws, censored, or made illegal. Such grounds, and even the definition of pornography have differed in various historical, cultural, and national contexts. The Indian Sanskrit text Kama sutra written in 3rd century CE contained prose, poetry, and illustrations regarding sexual behavior, and the book was celebrated; while the British English text Fanny Hill (1748) considered to be "the first original English prose pornography," has been one of the most prosecuted and banned books in history. In the late 19th century, a film by Thomas Edison which depicted a kiss was denounced as obscene in the United States, whereas Eugène Pirou's 1896 film Bedtime for the Bride was received very favorably in France. Starting from the mid-twentieth century onwards, societal attitudes towards sexuality became more lenient in the Western world, and legal definitions of obscenity made limited. In 1969, Blue Movie by Andy Warhol became the first film to depict unsimulated sex that received a wide theatrical release in the United States. This was followed by the Golden Age of Porn (1969–1984) a time period when many high quality pornographic films played in theaters, and became part of popular culture. The introduction of home video and the World Wide Web in the late 20th century led to worldwide growth in the pornography business. Starting from the 21st century, greater access to the internet and affordable smartphones among people made pornography more culturally mainstream.

Research has suggested that there are four broad motivations for people to use pornography, namely: "using pornography for fantasy, habitual use, mood management, and as part of a relationship." People in general view pornography for various reasons; ranging from a need to enrich their sexual arousal, as an aid for masturbation, to facilitate orgasm, learn about sexual techniques, reduce stress, alleviate boredom, enjoy themselves, see representation of people like themselves, explore their sexuality, know their sexual orientation, improve their romantic relationships, or simply because their partner wants them to. Studies have found that sexual function defined as "a person's ability to respond sexually or to experience sexual pleasure," is better in women who consume pornography frequently than in women who do not. No such association has been found in men. As for pornography use to have any implication on public health, scholars have noted that pornography use does not meet the definition of a public health crisis. Comparative studies have noted that higher "pornography consumption" and "pornography tolerance" in people is associated with their greater support for gender equality; people who support regulated pornography were found to be more egalitarian than those who support pornography ban. People who take porn as sex education material were found more likely to not use condoms in their own sex life; a risky behaviour that is warned against considering the fact that performers for pornographic studios  undergo regular testing for STIs every two weeks unlike much of the general public. While some feminist groups sought to abolish pornography believing it to be harmful, other feminist groups have opposed censorship efforts insisting pornography is benign. Longitudinal study has found that pornography use could not be a contributing factor in intimate partner violence.

By being an early adopter of various technological innovations ahead of other industries, and as a provider of financial capital; the pornography industry has been cited to be a contributing factor in the development and popularization of many commercial technologies. The accurate economic size of the porn industry in the early-twenty-first century is unknown. Kassia Wosick, a sociologist from New Mexico State University, estimated the world wide market value of porn to be at US$97 billion in 2015, with the U.S. revenue estimated between $10 and $12 billion; IBISWorld, a leading industry market researcher, projected total U.S. revenue to reach US$3.3 billion in the year 2020. In 2018, pornography in Japan was estimated to worth over $20 billion. The U.S. pornography industry employs numerous performers along with production and support staff. It has its own industry-specific publications, XBIZ and AVN; a trade association, the Free Speech Coalition; and award shows, XBIZ Awards and AVN Awards. Apart from regular media coverage, the industry receives considerable attention from private organizations, government agencies, and political organizations. Of late, unscrupulous pornography such as deepfake pornography, and revenge porn have become issues of concern.

Etymology and definition

The word pornography is a conglomerate of two ancient Greek words:  "prostitution,"
and  "writing, recording, or description."

The term  originally meant "bought, purchased" similar to  "to sell," from the proto-Indo-European root per- to hand over - alluding to the notion of selling.

"someone writing about harlots" in the 3rd century CE work Deipnosophists by Athenaeus.

The Modern Greek word  is a reborrowing of the French . "" was in use in the French language during the 1800s. The word did not enter the English language as the familiar word until 1847, or as a French import in New Orleans in 1842. The word was originally introduced by classical scholars as "a bookish, and therefore nonoffensive, term for writing about prostitutes,"
 but its meaning was quickly expanded to include all forms of "objectionable or obscene material in art and literature." As early as 1864, Webster's Dictionary defined the word as "a licentious painting," and the Oxford English Dictionary definitions being: obscene painting (1842), description of obscene matters, obscene publication (1977 or earlier). In informal language, pornography is often abbreviated to porn or porno.

Definitions for the term pornography are varied, with people from both pro- and anti-pornography groups defining it either favorably or unfavourably, thus making any definition of the term "pornography" very stipulative.

In 1964, when the US Supreme Court faced a controversy over whether Louis Malle’s French film The Lovers violated the First Amendment prohibition against obscene speech; Justice Potter Stewart in determining what exactly distinguishes pornography from obscenity, famously stated that he could never certainly succeed in precisely defining porn but knows what counts as pornography when he encounters it: “I know it when I see it,” he said.

Nevertheless, academic researchers have defined pornography as sexual subject material "such as a picture, video, or text," that is primarily intended to assist sexual arousal in the consumer, and is made and supplied with "the consent of all persons involved."

Pornography throughout history

Pornography from ancient times 
Depictions of a sexual nature have existed since prehistoric times as seen in the venus figurines and rock art. People across various civilizations have created works that depicted explicit sex; these works included artifacts, music, poetry, and murals among other things that are often interwined with religious and supernatural themes. The oldest artifacts, including a venus figurine, that are considered pornographic were discovered in 2008 CE at a cave near Stuttgart, Germany; radiocarbon dating suggests them to be at least 35,000 years old, from the aurignacian period. Vast number of artifacts have been discovered from ancient mesopotamia that depicted explicit heterosexual sex.

Glyptic art from the Sumerian Early Dynastic Period frequently shows scenes of frontal sex in the missionary position. In Mesopotamian votive plaques from the early second millennium BCE, a man is usually shown penetrating a woman from behind while she bends over drinking beer through a straw. Middle Assyrian lead votive figurines often represented a man standing and penetrating a woman as she rests on top of an altar. Scholars have traditionally interpreted all these depictions as scenes of hieros gamos (an ancient sacred marriage between a god and a goddess), but they are more likely to be associated with the cult of Inanna, the goddess of sex and prostitution. Many sexually explicit images were found in the temple of Inanna at Assur, which also contained models of male and female sexual organs.

Depictions of sexual intercourse were not part of the general repertory of ancient Egyptian formal art, but rudimentary sketches of heterosexual intercourse have been found on pottery fragments and in graffiti. The final two thirds of the Turin Erotic Papyrus (Papyrus 55001), an Egyptian papyrus scroll discovered at Deir el-Medina, consist a series of twelve vignettes showing men and women in various sexual positions. The scroll was probably painted in the Ramesside period (1292–1075 BCE) and its high artistic quality indicates that it was produced for a wealthy audience. No other similar scrolls have yet been discovered.

The society of the ancient Greece had been noted for its lenient attitudes towards representation of sexuality in the fields of arts and literatures.
The Greek poet Sappho's Ode to Aphrodite (600 BCE) is considered an earliest example of lesbian poetry. Red-figure pottery invented in Greece (530 BCE) often portrayed images that displayed eroticism.
The fifth century BC comic Aristophanes elaborated 106 ways of describing the male genitalia and in 91 ways of the female. Lysistrata (411 BCE) is a sex-war comedy play that was performed in ancient Greece.

Some ancient Hindu temples incorporated various aspects of sexuality into their art works. The temples at Khajuraho and Konark are renowned for their sculptures that detailed human sexual activity. These depictions were meant to be seen with a spiritual outlook as sexual arousal was believed to denote the embodying of the divine.

In India, Hinduism embraced an open attitude towards sex as an art, science and spiritual practice. Kama, the word used to connote sexual desire, was explored in the Indian literary works such as the Kama sutra and Kamashastra. These collections of sexually explicit writings covered practical, as well as the psychological aspects of human courtship and sexual intercourse. The Sanskrit text Kama sutra was put together by the sage Vatsyayana in its final form sometime during the second half of the third century CE. The text included prose, poetry, as well as illustrations regarding erotic love and sexual behaviour, and was one of the most celebrated Indian erotic work. Another medieval Indian literary work that explored sexuality is the Koka shastra.

Other examples of early art and literature of sexual nature include the artifacts of the Moche people in Peru (100 CE to 800 CE); the ninth century Japanese art form called Shunga that depicted sexual acts on woodblock prints and paintings; and the fifteenth-century Arabic sex manual The Perfumed Garden.

Pornography in early modern era 

In Europe, the book Fanny Hill (1748), considered "the first original English prose pornography, and the first pornography to use the form of the novel," was an erotic literary work by John Cleland; first published in England as Memoirs of a Woman of Pleasure. The novel has been one of the most prosecuted and banned books in history. The author was charged for "corrupting the King's subjects."

French aristocrat Marquis de Sade (1740–1814), whose name helped derive the words “sadism” and “sadist” advocated libertine sexuality. He published writings that were critical of authorities, many of which often contained pornographic content. 

During the Victorian era (1837–1901); the invention of the rotary printing press made publication of books easier, many works of lascivious nature were published during this period, often under pen names or anonymity. These works are considered bold and graphic even by today's lenient standards; popular publications from this era include: The Pearl (magazine of erotic tales and poems published from 1879 to 1881); Gamiani, or Two Nights of Excess (1870) by Alfred de Musset; and Venus in Furs (1870) by Leopold von Sacher-Masoch from whose name the 
term masochism was derived.

The Sins of the Cities of the Plain (1881) is one of the first sole male homosexual literary work published in English, this work is said to have inspired another gay literary work, Teleny, or The Reverse of the Medal (1893) whose authorship has often been attributed to Oscar Wilde.

The Romance of Lust, written Anonymously and published in four volumes during 1873-1876, contained graphical descriptions of themes detailing incest, homosexuality, and orgies. Other publications from the Victorian era that included fetish and taboo themes like sadomasochism and 'cross-generational sex' are: My Secret Life (1888–1894) and Forbidden Fruit (1898). On accusations of obscenity, many of these works were outlawed until the 1960s. 

In 1857, England passed a law banning the sale of obscene materials. When large-scale excavations of Pompeii were undertaken in the 1860s, much of the erotic literature and art of the ancient Romans came to light, shocking the Victorians, who saw themselves as the intellectual heirs of the Roman Empire. They did not know what to do with the very frank depictions of sexuality and endeavored to hide them away from everyone but upper-class scholars. The moveable objects were locked away in the Secret Museum in Naples and what could not be removed was covered and cordoned off so as to not corrupt the sensibilities of women, children, and the working classes.

Criminalization 
The world's first law that criminalized pornography was the English Obscene Publications Act 1857, which was enacted at the urging of the Society for the Suppression of Vice. The Act, passed by the British Parliament in 1857, applied to the United Kingdom and Ireland made the sale of obscene material a statutory offence, and gave authorities the power to seize and destroy any offending material.

When pornographic material flourished in Victorian era England, the affluent classes believed they are sensible enough to deal with it unlike the lower working classes, whom they thought would get distracted by such material and cease to be productive. Beliefs that masturbation would make people ill, insane, or become blind also flourished. The obscenity act gave the government officials power to interfere into the private lives of people unlike no other law before. People suspected for masturbation were often forced to wear chastity devices. "Cures" and "treatment" for masturbation involved such measures like giving electric shock, and applying carbolic acid to the clitoris. The law was criticised for being established on still yet unproven claims that sexual material is noxius for people or public health.

The American equivalent of the Obscene Act was the Comstock Act of 1873 The anti-obscenity bill, drafted by Anthony Comstock, was debated for less than an hour in the U.S. Congress before being passed into law. Apart from the power to seize and destroy any obscene material, the law made it possible for the authorities to make arrests over any perceived act of obscenity including possession of contraceptives by married couples. Reportedly in the U.S. 15 tons of books and 4 million pictures were destroyed, and about 15 people were driven to suicide, with 4,000 arrests.

The English Act did not apply to Scotland where the common law continued to apply. Before the English Act, the publication of obscene material was treated as a common law misdemeanour, which made effectively prosecuting authors and publishers difficult even in cases where the material was clearly intended as pornography. However neither the English, nor the United States Act defined what constituted "obscene," leaving this for the courts to determine. For implementing the Comstock act, the U.S. courts used the British Hicklin test to define obscenity, the definition of which became cemented in 1896 and continued until the mid-twentieth century. Starting from 1957 to 1997, the U.S. Supreme Court made numerous judgements that redefined obscenity.

The nineteenth-century legislations eventually outlawed the publication, retail, and trafficking of certain writings and images that were deemed pornographic. Although the laws ordered the destruction of shop and warehouse stock meant for sale, the private possession and viewing of (some forms of) pornography was not made an offence until the twentieth century. Historians have explored the role of pornography in social history and the history of morality. The Victorian attitude that pornography was only for a select few can be seen in the wording of the Hicklin test stemming from a court case in 1868, where it asked: "whether the tendency of the matter charged as obscenity is to deprave and corrupt those whose minds are open to such immoral influences." 

Even though officially prohibited, the sale of sexual material nevertheless continued through "under the counter" means. Magazines specialising in a genre called "saucy and spicy" became popular during this time. Titles of few popular magazines from this period, around 1896 to 1955, are Wink: A Whirl of Girls, Flirt: A FRESH Magazine, and Snappy. Cover stories of these magazines featured segments such as “perky pin-ups,” and “high-heel cuties.”

Some of the popular erotic literary works from the twentieth century include the novels: Story of the Eye (1928), Tropic of 
Cancer (1934), Tropic of Capricorn (1938), 
the French Histoire d’O (Story of O) (1954); and short stories: Delta of Venus (1977), and Little Birds (1979).

After the invention of photography, the birth of erotic photography followed. The oldest surviving image of a pornographic photo is dated back to about 1846, which was described to have depicted “a rather solemn man gingerly inserting his penis into the vagina of an equally solemn and middle-aged woman.” The Parisian demimonde included Napoleon III's minister, Charles de Morny, an early patron who delighted in acquiring and displaying erotic photos at large gatherings.

Pornographic film production commenced almost immediately after the invention of the motion picture in 1895. A pioneer of the motion picture camera, Thomas Edison, released various films which were denounced as obscene in late 19th century America. Two of the earliest pioneers were Eugène Pirou and Albert Kirchner. Kirchner directed the earliest surviving pornographic film for Pirou under the trade name "Léar". The 1896 film  showed Louise Willy performing a striptease. Pirou's film inspired a genre of risqué French films that showed women disrobing, and other filmmakers realised profits could be made from such films.

Legalization 
 Sexually explicit films opened producers and distributors to prosecution. Such films were produced illicitly by amateurs, starting in the 1920s, primarily in France and the United States. Processing the film was risky, as was their distribution which was strictly private.

In 1969, Denmark became the first country to abolish censorship; thereby legalizing pornography including child pornography, which led to an explosion of investment in—and commercial production—of pornography. In 1980, Denmark prohibited Child pornography. Although legalized in Denmark, pornography was illegal in other countries, and had to be smuggled in, where it was then sold "under the counter" or (sometimes) shown in "members only" cinema clubs. 

Nonetheless, and also in 1969, Blue Movie by Andy Warhol, became the first feature film to depict explicit sexual intercourse that received a wide theatrical release in the United States. 

Film scholar Linda Williams remarked that prurience “is a key term in any discussion of moving-image sex since the sixties. Often it is the “interest” to which no one wants to own up.”

Blue Movie was a seminal film in the Golden Age of Porn, and according to Warhol, a major influence in the making of Last Tango in Paris, an internationally controversial erotic drama film starring Marlon Brando that released a few years after Blue Movie was made. 

In 1970, the United States President's Commission on Obscenity and Pornography, set up to study the effects of pornography, found that there was "no evidence to date that exposure to explicit sexual materials plays a significant role in the causation of delinquent or criminal behavior among youths or adults." The report further recommended against placing any restriction on the access of pornography by adults, and suggested that legislation "should not seek to interfere with the right of adults who wish to do so to read, obtain, or view explicit sexual materials." Regarding the notion that sexually explicit content is improper; the Commission found it "inappropriate to adjust the level of adult communication to that considered suitable for children." The Supreme Court supported this view.

In 1988, the Supreme Court of California ruled in the People v. Freeman case that: filming of sexual activity for sale—does not amount to procuring or prostitution—and thus it shall be given protection under the first amendment. This ruling effectively legalized the production of X rated adult content in the los Angeles county which by 2005 emerged as the largest centre in the world for the production of pornographic films.

Pornographic films appeared throughout the twentieth century. First as stag films (1900 to 1940s); then as porn loops (short films) for peep shows in the 1960s; followed by as feature films for theatrical releases during the 1970s; and as home videos in the 1980s.

Pornographic magazines published during the mid-twentieth century have been noted for playing an important role in the sexual revolution; and the liberalization of laws, and attitudes towards sexual representation in the Western world.

In 1953, Hugh Hefner published the first issue of the Playboy in the U.S., a magazine which he described as a “handbook for the urban male”. The magazine contained images of nude women along with articles and interviews covering political and cultural topics.

Around this time, in 1965 Bob Guccione in the U.K. started his publication Penthouse, and published its first american issue in 1969 as a direct competitor to Playboy. In its early days, the images of naked women in Playboy did not show any pubic hair or genitals; Penthouse became the first magazine to show pubic hair in 1970. Playboy followed the lead and there ensued a competition between the two adult magazines over publication of racy pictures; a contest that was  labelled as the "Pubic wars".

“We were the first to show full frontal nudity. The first to expose the clitoris completely. I think we made 
a very serious contribution to the liberalization of laws and attitudes. HBO would not have gone as far as it does if it wasn’t for us breaking the barriers. Much that has happened now in the Western world with respect to sexual advances is directly due to steps that we took.” — Bob Guccione; Penthouse founder in 2004.

The tussle between Playboy and Penthouse paled into obscurity when Larry Flynt started Hustler which became the first magazine to publish labial “pink shots” in 1974. Hustler projected itself as the magazine for the working classes as opposed to the urban centered Playboy and Penthouse.
During the same time in 1972, Helen Gurley Brown, editor of the Cosmopolitan magazine, published a centerfold that featured actor Burt Reynolds in nude. His popular pose has been later emulated by 
many other famous people. The success of Cosmo 
led to the launch of Playgirl in 1973.

In 2010s, the market for printed versions of the pornographic magazines declined, many magazines developed their own websites and became online publications. The best-selling U.S. adult magazines maintain greater reach compared to most other non-pornographic magazines, and are amongst the top-selling magazines of any type.

Modern-day pornography 

Starting from the 1990's, Internet played a major role in improving the accessibility of pornography. Usenet newsgroups served as the base for what has been called the "amateur revolution" where amateur pornographers from the late 1980s and early 1990s, with the help of digital cameras and the internet, created and distributed their own pornographic content independent of the mainstream networks. 

The use of World Wide Web became popular with the introduction of Netscape navigator in 1994. This development paved the way for newer methods of distribution and consumption of pornography. In 1995 Time published a cover story titled "Cyberporn" and mentioned that pornographic photos constitute over 80 percent of the online photographs.

Danni's Hard Drive started in 1995, by Danni Ashe is considered to be one of the earliest online pornographic websites; coded by Ashe, a former stripper and nude model, the website was reported by CNN in 2000 to have made revenues of $6.5 million. In 2012, the total number of pornographic websites were estimated to be around 25 million, comprising 12% of all the websites.

With the introduction of broadband connections, much of the distribution networks moved online, giving consumers anonymous access to a wide range of pornographic material. The development of streaming sites, peer-to-peer file sharing (P2P) networks, and tube sites led to a subsequent decline in the sale of DVDs and adult magazines. Data from 2015 suggests an increase in pornography viewing over the past few decades, this has been attributed to the growth of Internet pornography.

Through the 2010s, many pornographic production companies and top pornographic websites such as Pornhub, RedTube and YouPorn have been acquired by MindGeek—a company that has been described as "a monopoly" in the pornography business. As of 2022, the total pornographic content accessible online is estimated to be over 10,000 terabytes. Xvideos.com and Pornhub.com are the two most visited pornographic websites.

Technological advancements such as laptops, digital cameras, smartphones, and Wi-Fi, have democratized the production and accessibility of pornography in the modern-world. Subscription-based service providers such as Onlyfans, founded in 2016, are increasingly becoming popular as the platforms for pornography distribution in the digital era. Apart from professional pornographers, content creators on such platforms include others; from a physics teacher, to a race car driver, to a woman undergoing cancer treatment. 

XBIZ and AVN are the two industry-specific organizations based in the U.S. that provide legal news and information about the adult entertainment industry.
The scholarly study of pornography, notably in cultural studies, is limited. The first peer-reviewed academic journal about the study of pornography, Porn Studies, was published in 2014. Greater access to the internet and affordable smartphones among people made pornography more culturally mainstream in the twenty-first century.

Classification and commercialism

Classification
Pornography in general is classified as either softcore or hardcore based on its content. Nudity is often included in both the forms. Softcore pornography contains nudity or partial nudity in a sexually suggestive way but without any explicit depiction of sexual activity; whereas hardcore pornography includes depiction of explicit sexual activity. Softcore pornography is generally classified as erotica.

Based on the production methods and the intended consumers, pornography is classified as either mainstream or indie.

Mainstream pornography mostly caters to the hetrosexual consumers in general, and involves performers working under corporate film studios for their respective productions. Pornography featuring heterosexual acts comprise the bulk of the mainstream porn, marking the industry more or less as "heteronormative."

Indie or independent pornography consists of pornography productions by performers independent of mainstream studios. These productions often feature different scenarios and sexual activity compared to the mainstream porn, and cater to more specific audience. The performers in indie porn sometimes work in partnership with other performers; apart from content creation, they do the background work such as videography, editing, web development, themselves and distribute under their own brand. The rise of indie porn has been noted as a cause for decline in the business of mainstream porn. Reportedly applications for porn-shoot permits by established pornography companies fell by 95 percent during the years 2012-2015.

Pornography encompasses a wide variety of genres, providing for the enormous range of consumer tastes. Some examples of the pornography genres include: alt, bondage, bisexual, convent, ethnic, gonzo, gay, mormon, parody, reality,  rape, transgender, zombie etc.

The most searched for pornography genres on the internet are: lesbian, hentai, fauxcest, milf, big ass, and creampie.

Pornography also features numerous fetishes like "'fat' porn, amateur porn, disabled porn, porn produced by women, queer porn, BDSM and body modification."

The production and distribution of pornography are economic activities of some importance. In the United States, the pornography industry employs about 20,000 people including 2000 to 3000 performers, and is centered in the San Fernando Valley of Los Angeles. By 2005 it became the largest centre for pornography productions in the world.

An analysis by MetaCert, a company that specializes on internet safety, revealed that the United States was the country that hosted the most porn, accounting for 60 percent of all the websites containing pornographic content.

In Europe, Budapest is regarded as the industry center. Other pornography production centres in the world are located in Florida (US), Brazil, Czech Republic and Japan.
Piracy, the illegal copying and distribution of material, is of great concern to the porn industry. The industry is the subject of many litigations and formalized anti-piracy efforts.

Economics

Revenues of the adult industry in the United States are difficult to determine. In 1970, a federal study estimated the total retail value of hardcore pornography in the United States was no more than $10 million. In 1998, Forrester Research published a report on the online "adult content" industry, estimating annual revenue at $750 million to $1 billion. Studies in 2001 put the total (including video, pay-per-view, Internet and magazines) between $2.6 billion and $3.9 billion. The introduction of home video and the World Wide Web in the late twentieth century led to a global growth in the business of pornography.

In 2010, CNBC has estimated that pornography was a $13 billion industry in the US, with $3,075 being spent on porn every second and a new porn video being produced every 39 minutes. 
As of 2011, pornography was becoming one of the biggest businesses in the United States. In 2014, the porn industry was believed to bring in more than $13 billion on a yearly basis in the United States. 

The exact economic size of the porn industry in the early-twenty-first century is unknown to anyone. Kassia Wosick, a sociologist from New Mexico State University, estimated the global porn market value at $97 billion in 2015, with the U.S. revenue estimated at $10 and $12 billion; IBISWorld, a leading researcher of various markets and industries, calculated total U.S. revenue to reach $3.3 billion by 2020. In 2018, pornography in Japan was estimated to worth over $20 billion.

Technology

Pornographers have taken advantage of each major technological advancement in the production and distribution of their services. Pornography is considered a driving force in the development of various technologies from the printing press, through photography (still and motion), to satellite TV, from home video, to internet Streaming.

The porn industry has been noted for its influence on the development and popularization of various commercial technologies by being an early adopter. From smaller film cameras, VCR's, to the internet, the porn industry has employed newer technologies much before than other commercial industries, thus aiding in their development by providing the early financial capital.

In the early 2000s, Wicked Pictures pushed for the adoption of MPEG-4 file format ahead of others, this later became the most commonly used format over high speed internet connections.

In 2009, Pink Visual became one of the first companies to licence and produce content with a software introduced by a small toronto-based company called "Spatial view" that made it possible to view 3-D content on iphones. 

Many of the innovative data rendering procedures, enhanced payment systems, customer service models, and security methods, developed by pornography companies have been co-opted by other mainstream businesses. Pornography companies served as the base for a large number of innovations in web development. Much of the IT work in porn companies is done by people who are referred to as a "porn webmaster," often paid well in what are small businesses, they have more freedom to test innovations compared to other IT employees in larger organizations who tend to be risk-averse. 

The pornography industry has been considered an influential factor in deciding the format wars in media, including being a factor in the VHS vs. Betamax format war (the videotape format war) and the Blu-ray vs. HD DVD format war (the high-def format war). Success of innovative technologies is predicted by their greater use in porn industry.

The various mediums used for pornography depictions have evolved throughout the course of human history, starting from prehistoric cave paintings, forty millennia ago, to futuristic virtual reality renditions.

Some pornography is even produced without human actors at all. The idea of completely computer-generated pornography was conceived very early as one of the most obvious areas of application for computer graphics and 3D rendering. Until the late 1990s, digitally manipulated pornography could not be produced cost-effectively. In the early 2000s, it became a growing segment, as the modelling and animation software matured, and the rendering capabilities of computers improved. Further advances in technology have allowed increasingly photorealistic 3D figures to be used in interactive pornography. The first pornographic film to be shot in 3D was 3D Sex and Zen: Extreme Ecstasy, released on 14 April 2011 in Hong Kong.

Consumption

The vast majority of US men use porn. The Huffington Post reported in 2013 that 70% of men and 30% of women watch porn, with porn websites registering higher number of visitors than Netflix, Amazon and Twitter combined.
A study in 2008 found that among University students aged 18 to 26, located in six college sites across the United States; 67% of young men and 49% of young women approved pornography viewing, with nearly 9 out of 10 men (87%) and 31% women reportedly using pornography. Quite probably, the majority of US population between ages 18 and 35 use porn at least once a week.

About 90% of pornography is consumed on the internet with consumers preferring content that's in tune with their sexuality. Researchers at McGill University noted that on viewing pornographic content, men reached their maximum arousal in about 11 minutes and women in about 12 minutes. An average visit to a pornographic website lasts for 11.6 minutes. Both marriage and divorce are found to be associated with lower subscription rates for adult entertainment websites. Subscriptions are more widespread in regions that have higher measures of social capital. Pornographic websites are often visited during office hours. No correlation has been found between the practice of sexual consent or lack of it, and pornography consumption in people.

A 2006 study of Norwegian  adults found that over 80% of the respondents used pornography at some point in their life. A difference of 20% between men and women was found in their respective use of pornography. Since the late 1960s, attitudes towards pornography have become more positive in Nordic countries, in Sweden and Finland the consumption of pornography has increased over the years.

In 2022, a national survey in Japan, of men and women aged 20 to 69, found that 76% of men and 29% of women used pornography as part of sexual activity.

Legality and regulations

The legal status of pornography varies widely from country to country.
 Regulating hardcore pornography is more common than regulating softcore pornography. Child pornography is illegal in almost all countries,
 and some countries have restrictions on rape pornography or animal pornography.

Disseminating pornography to a minor is generally illegal. There are various measures to restrict minors' any access to pornography, including protocols for pornographic stores. Sometimes the measures may be bypassed by minors as many online sites only require the user to tell the website they are a certain age, and no other age verification is required. The Child Online Protection Act would have restricted access by minors to any material on the Internet defined as harmful to them, but it did not take effect.

The adult film industry regulations in California require that all actors and actresses practice safe sex using condoms. It is rare to see condom use in pornography. As porn does better financially when actors are without condoms, many companies film in other states. Miami is a major area for amateur porn. Twitter is the popular social media platform used by the performers in porn industry as it does not censor content unlike Instagram and Facebook.

In the United States, a person receiving unwanted commercial mail that he or she deems pornographic (or otherwise offensive) may obtain a Prohibitory Order.

Some people, including pornography producer Larry Flynt and the writer Salman Rushdie, have argued that pornography is vital to freedom and that a free and civilized society should be judged by its willingness to accept pornography.

The UK government has criminalized possession of what it terms "extreme pornography," following the highly publicized murder of Jane Longhurst.

Pornography can infringe into basic human rights of those involved, especially when sexual consent was not obtained. For example, revenge porn is a phenomenon where disgruntled sexual partners release images or video footage of intimate sexual activity, usually on the internet, without authorization from the other person. Lawmakers have also raised concerns about "upskirt" photos taken of women without their consent. In many countries there has been a demand to make such activities specifically illegal; carrying higher punishments than mere breach of privacy, or image rights, or circulation of prurient material. As a result, some jurisdictions have enacted specific laws against "revenge porn".

What is not pornography
In the U.S., a July 2014 criminal case decision in Massachusetts; Commonwealth v. Rex, 469 Mass. 36 (2014), made a legal determination of what was not to be considered "pornography" and in this particular case "child pornography". It was determined that photographs of naked children that were from sources such as National Geographic magazine, a sociology textbook, and a nudist catalog were not considered pornography in Massachusetts even while in the possession of a convicted and (at the time) incarcerated sex offender.

Drawing the line depends on time and place; Occidental mainstream culture got increasingly "pornified" (i.e. tainted by pornographic themes and mainstream films got to include unsimulated sexual acts).

Copyright status
In the United States, some courts have applied US copyright protection to pornographic materials. Some courts have held that copyright protection effectively applies to works, whether they are obscene or not, but not all courts have ruled the same way. The copyright protection rights of pornography in the United States has again been challenged as late as February 2012.

STIs prevention and safer sex practices 

Performers working in pornographic film studios undergo regular testing for STIs every two weeks. They have to test negative for: HIV, syphilis, chlamydia, gonorrhea, trichomoniasis, and hepatitis B and C, before showing up on a set who are then inspected for sores on their mouths, hands and genitals, before commencing work. The industry believes this method of testing to be a viable practice for safer sex, as its medical consultants claim: that since 2004, about 350,000 pornographic scenes have been filmed without condoms, and HIV has not been transmitted even once because of performance on a set.
 However, some studies suggest that adult film performers have high rates of chlamydia and/or gonorrhea infection, and many of these cases may be missed by industry screening because these bacteria can colonize many sites on the body.

Dr. Allan Ronald, a Canadian doctor and HIV/AIDS specialist who did groundbreaking studies on the transmission of STIs among prostitutes in Africa, said there's no doubt about the efficiency of the testing method, but he felt little uncomfortable: "because it’s giving the wrong message — that you can have multiple sex partners without condoms — but I can’t say it doesn’t work.”

Relatedly, it has been found that individuals who have received little sex education and/or perceive pornography as a source of information about sex are less apt to use condoms. The Free Speech Coalition cautions viewers to not consider pornography as sex education material and enact what they see, as porn presents an unrealistic image of sexuality in as much as tobacco ads present an ideal image of people smoking without showing its ill effects. In 2020, the US National Sex Education 
Standards, released recommendations to incorporate porn literacy to students from grade 6 to 12 as part of sex education in the United States.

Pornographic actress Nina Hartley, who has a degree in nursing, stated that the amount of time involved in shooting a scene can be very long, and with condoms in place it becomes a painful proposition; as their usage is uncomfortable despite the use of lube, causes friction burn, and opens up lesions in the genital mucosa. Advocating the testing method for performers in the industry, Hartley said "Testing works for us, and condoms work for outsiders."

Emphasizing that performers in the industry take necessary precautions like PrEP and are at lower risk to contract HIV than most sexually active persons outside the industry, many prominent female performers have vehemently opposed regulatory measures like Measure B which sought to make the use of condoms mandatory in pornographic films. Professional female performers have called the use of condoms on daily basis at work an occupational hazard, as they cause micro-tears, friction burn, swelling, and yeast infections which altogether, they say, makes them more susceptible to contract STIs.

Views on pornography

General
Pornography is viewed by people in general for various reasons; from a need to enrich their sexual arousal, to facilitate orgasm, learn about sexual techniques, reduce stress, alleviate boredom, enjoy themselves, see representation of people like themselves, know their sexual orientation, improve their romantic relationships, or simply because their partner wants them to. Research has suggested the presence of four broad motivations for people in using pornography, namely: "using pornography for fantasy, habitual use, mood management, and as part of a relationship." Men are found to consume pornography more frequently than women, with the intent for consumption that may vary, with men more likely to use pornography as a stimulant for sexual arousal during solitary sexual activity; while women are more likely to use pornography as a source of information or entertainment, and rather prefer using it together with a partner to enhance sexual stimulation during partnered sexual activity.

Studies have found that sexual functioning defined as "a person's ability to respond sexually or to experience sexual pleasure" was greater in women who frequently consume pornography than in women who do not. 
No such association has been found in men though. Women who consume pornography are more likely to know about their own sexual interests and desires, and in turn be willing and able to communicate them during partnered sexual activity. It has been reported that in women the ability to communicate sexual preferences is associated with greater sexual satisfaction. Pornographic material is found to expand the sexual repertoire in women by making them learn new rewarding sexual behaviours such as clitoral stimulation and enhance their overall 'sexual flexibility'. Women who consume pornography frequently are more easily aroused during partnered sex, and are more likely to engage in oral sexual activity compared to the women who do not view pornography. Women users of pornography had reported (almost 50%) to have engaged in cunnilingus, which research suggests is related to female orgasm, and to have had experienced orgasms more frequently than women who do not use pornography (87% vs. 64%).

A two year long survey (2018-2020), conducted to assess the role of pornography in the lives of highly educated medical university students, with median age of 24, in Germany, found that pornography served as an inspiration for many students in their sex life. Pornography use among students was higher in males than in females, among the male students those who did not cheat on their partner or contracted an STI were found to be more frequent consumers of pornography. Although pornography use was more common among men, associations between pornography use and sexuality were more apparent in women. Among the female students, those who reported to be satisfied with their physical appearance consumed three times as much pornography than the female students who have reported to be dissatisfied with their body. A feeling of physical inadequacy was found to be a restraining factor in the consumption of pornography. Female students who consume pornography more often reported to have had multiple sexual partners. Both female and male students, who enjoyed the experience of anal intercourse in their life, have been reported to be frequent consumers of pornography. Sexual content depicting bondage, domination, or violence, was consumed by only a minority of 10%. More sexual openness, and less sexual anxiety, was noted in students who regularly consumed pornography. No association has been found between regular pornography use and experience of sexual dissatisfaction in either female or male students. This finding was in concurrence with another longitudinal study which demonstrated that most consumers of pornography differentiate pornographic sex from real partnered sex, and thus do not experience diminishing satisfaction with their own sex life.

Pornography has been referred by people as a means to explore their own sexuality. People have reported pornography to be helpful in learning about human sexuality in general. Studies have encouraged clinical practitioners to use pornography as an instruction material to show clients new and alternative sexual behaviours as part of their psychosexual therapy. Surveys have found a gradual increase in acceptance of pornography over the years amongst the general American public.

Feminist

Feminist movements in the late 1970s and 1980s dealt with the issues of pornography and sexuality in debates that are referred to as the sex wars. While some feminist groups sought to abolish pornography believing it to be harmful, other feminist groups have opposed censorship efforts insisting it is benign.

A large scale study of data from the General Social Survey (2010–2018) refuted the argument that pornography is inherently anti-woman or anti-feminist, and that it drives sexism. The study did not find a relationship between "pornography viewing" and "pornography tolerance" with higher sexism—a posit that was held by some feminists; it instead found them to be associated with greater support for gender equality. The study concluded that "pornography is more likely to be about the sex rather than the sexism."

People who supported regulated pornography expressed lesser attitudes of sexism than people who sought to abolish pornography. Notably, non-feminists are found to be more likely to support a ban on pornography than feminists. Many feminists, both male and female, have reflected that effects of pornography on society are neutral. Users of pornography are found to be more egalitarian than nonusers; they are more likely to hold favorable attitudes towards women, in positions of power and in workplaces outside home, than the nonusers.

Black feminist scholars have criticised the American adult entertainment industry for what they perceive as omission and exclusion of black women from interracial pornography genre that mostly features black men and white women. The non representation of black women in one of the most financially prosperous niches of contemporary American commercial pornography, and the creation of another category "reverse IR," is seen as reflective of the larger societal ideals of beauty and body that render women of color as "not merely invisible but also inhuman." Black women are featured for lesser number of times in the productions of mainstream porn studios. As pornography becomes a kind of manual on how bodies in pleasure can look, and is "one of the few places where we see our bodies--and other people's bodies," it becomes imperative on pornography to represent "variety of forms," noted the black feminist scholars. Mireille Miller-Young in her research on porn industry, found that black women make less money then their white counterparts. White women have historically made 75 percent more per scene and sometimes still make 50 percent more compared to the black women. 

Prominent anti-pornography feminists such as Andrea Dworkin and Catharine MacKinnon argue that all pornography is demeaning to women, or that it contributes to violence against women–both in its production and in its consumption. The production of pornography, they argue, entails the physical, psychological, or economic coercion of the women who perform in it. They charged that pornography eroticizes the domination, humiliation and coercion of women, and reinforces sexual and cultural attitudes that are complicit in rape and sexual harassment. Other exclusionary feminists insist that pornography presents a severely distorted image of sexual consent, and reinforces sexual myths like: women are readily available–and desire to engage in sex at any time–with any man–on men's terms–and always respond positively to men's advances.

In contrast to the objections, other feminist scholars "ranging from Betty Friedan and Kate Millett to Karen DeCrow, Wendy Kaminer and Jamaica Kincaid" have supported the right to consume pornography. Wendy McElroy has noted that both feminism and pornography are mutually related, with both thriving in environments of tolerance, and both repressed anytime regulations are placed on sexual expression.

“If feminists define pornography, per se, as the enemy, the result will be to make a lot of women ashamed of their sexual feelings and afraid to be honest about them. And the last thing women need is more sexual shame, guilt, and hypocrisy—this time served up by feminism” — Ellen Willis.

The lesbian feminist movement of the 1980s is considered a seminal moment for the women in the porn industry as more women entered into the developmental side of the industry. This allowed women to gear porn more towards women; as they knew what women wanted, both from the perspective of actresses as well as the female audience. This change has been considered a good development as for a long time the porn industry has been directed by men for men. This move also sparked the arrival of making lesbian porn for lesbians instead of men. 

Furthermore, the advent of Vcr, home video, and affordable consumer video cameras allowed for the possibility of feminist pornography. Consumer video made it possible for the distribution and consumption of video pornography; and to locate women as legitimate consumers of pornography. Feminist porn directors are interested in challenging representations of men and women, as well as providing sexually-empowering imagery that features many kinds of bodies. Tristan Taormino says that feminist porn is "all about creating a fair working environment and empowering everyone involved."

Porn industry has been noted for being one of the few industries where women enjoy a power advantage in the workplace. "Actresses have the power," Alec Metro, one of the men in line, ruefully noted of the X-rated industry. A former firefighter who claimed to have lost a bid for a job to affirmative action, Metro was already divining that porn might not be the ideal career choice for escaping the forces of what he called 'reverse discrimination.' Female performers can often dictate which male actors they will and will not work with. Porn—at least, porn produced for a heterosexual audience—is one of the few contemporary occupations where the pay gap operates in the favour of women; the average actress makes fifty to a hundred per cent more money than her male counterpart.

Religious

As most religions have long and vehemently opposed sexual natured things in general, religious people are found highly susceptible to experience great distress in their use of pornography. Religious people who use pornography are found to feel sexually ashamed. Sexual shame, which rises from a persons perception of their self in other peoples minds, is considered to be a powerful factor that overtime governs individual behaviour. As sexuality is interwoven into ones personal identity, sexual shame or embarrassment are found to attack a persons very sense of self.

When a sexual shaming event occurs, the person attributes causation to oneself—resulting in self condemnation—and experience feelings of sadness, loneliness, anger, unworthiness, and rejection; with a perceived judgment of self by others. In this mental landscape, a fear arises that ones sexual self needs to be hiden. This psychological process initiates and fuels further shame and lowers self-esteem. Sexual shame in people begets more shame and leads to a cycle of powerlessness, culminating in deepening negative emotions.

People who tend to feel shame easily are found to be at greater risk for depression and anxiety disorders; the cause of attributing shame to sexuality is traced back to the biblical interpretation of nakedness as shameful. In Hinduism, the feelings of shame along with hatred and fear are considered detrimental to ones spiritual well being.

According to Indonesia's foremost Islamic preacher, Abdullah Gymnastiar, shame is a noble emotion commanded in the Qur'an and was held high by the prophet Muhammad, who was quoted as saying "Faith is compiled of seventy branches… and shame is one of them.” To cultivate shame in the believers, sexual gaze needs to be checked as unchecked gaze is believed to be the door through which Satan enters and soils the believers heart. In 2006 when anti-pornography protests erupted in Indonesia, the world's most populous  Muslim-majority country, over the publication of the inaugural Indonesian edition of Playboy magazine; Abdullah called for a legislation to ban pornography, and embarked on a mission to shroud the state with a sense of shame giving the slogan “the more shameful, the more faithful.” During these protests, Indonesia's foremost Islamic newspaper, Republika, published daily front page editorials that featured a logo of the word pornografi crossed out with a red X. Playboy's Jakarta office was ransacked by the members of Islamic Defenders Front (Front Pembela Islam or FPI), and bookstore owners were threatened to not sell any issue of the magazine. Eventually in December 2008, Indonesian lawmakers signed an anti-pornography bill into law with overwhelming political support.

Highly religious people are more likely to support policies against pornography, such as censorship, than least religious people.
Religious people are prone to having obsessive thoughts regarding sin and punishment by God over their pornography use, causing them to feel ashamed; and perceive themselves to have pornography addiction while also suffering from OCD related symptoms.

States that are highly religious and conservative were found to search for more Internet pornography. Some Christian denominations consider pornography use among Christian men and women as engaging in "digital adultery."

Critical 

Neuroscience has noted that minds of young are in developmental stages and exposure to emotionally charged material such as pornography would likely have an impact on them unlike on adults, and has suggested caution while enabling potential access to such material.

Studies on the harmful effects of pornography include finding any potential influence of pornography on rape, domestic violence, sexual dysfunction, difficulties with sexual relationships, and child sexual abuse. Research has found that pornography use was not a perpetrating factor in intimate partner violence. Several studies conclude that liberalization of porn in society may be associated with decreased rape and sexual violence rates, while others suggest no effect, or are inconclusive.

Scholars have noted that pornography use has no implication on public health, as pornography use does not meet the definition of a public health crisis.

While some literature reviews suggest pornographic images and films can be addictive, insufficient evidence exists to draw conclusions. Mental health experts are divided over the issue of pornography use being a problem for people. While it has not been proven that either porn or masturbation addiction exist, porn or masturbation compulsion may probably exist.

The increasing prevalence of alleged beauty enhancing procedures such as breast augmentation, and labiaplasty, among the common populace has been attributed to the popularity of pornography. 

Issues of doxing and revenge porn have been linked to a few pornography websites.

See also

 Adult animation
 Cartoon pornography
 Erotic comics
 Erotic hypnosis
 History of human sexuality
 Literotica
 Mobile porn
 Right to sexuality
 Sex in advertising
 Sex worker
 Sex-positive feminism
 Sex-positive movement
 Sexual and reproductive health and rights
 Sexual Freedom Awards
 Webcam model

Notes and references

References

Sources cited

Books

 

 

Shrage, Laurie (Fall 2015), "Feminist perspectives on sex markets: pornography",

Journals and magazines

News and websites

Further reading

Advocacy
 
  Both of Bright's books challenge any equations between feminism and anti-pornography positions.
 
 
 
  Student run newspaper.
 
  Performance artists and literary theorists who challenge Dworkin and MacKinnon.
  Defends the availability of pornography, and condemns feminist anti-pornography campaigns.
 
 
 
 
 
Review of Strossen's book: 
  Critique of Stoltenberg and Dworkin's positions on pornography and power.
 
Also as:

Opposition
  Assiter advocates seeing pornography as epitomizing a wider problem of oppression, exploitation and inequality which needs to be better understood.
  An argument for approaches to end harm to women caused by pornography.
  (Online version before inclusion in an issue.) An illustration of Catharine Mackinnon's theory that pornography silence's women's speech, this illustration differs from one given by Rae Langton (below).
  A critique of the pornographic industry within a Kantian ethical framework.
  A variety of essays that try to assess ways that pornography may take advantage of men.
  Pdf. A description of Catharine Mackinnon's theory that pornography silence's women's speech, this description differs from the one given by Alex Davies (above).
 
  Pdf. An argument that pornography is one element of an unjust institution of the subordination of women to men.
  Preview. An argument that pornography silences women therefore acting as an infringement of free speech (see Davies above, and Langton, also above).
 
  A defence of the Dworkin-MacKinnon definition and condemnation of pornography employing putatively relatively rigorous analysis.
See also:  A criticism of Vadas' paper.
  An argument that pornography increases women's vulnerability to rape.
  A representation of the causal connections between pornography and violence towards women.

Neutral or mixed
  Collection of papers from 1982 conference; visible and divisive split between anti-pornography activists and lesbian S&M theorists.
 Real Your Brain on Porn. Retrieved 2019-04-14.

External links

Commentary
  Interactive web site companion to a Frontline documentary exploring the pornography industry within the United States.

Economics
 

Government
 Kutchinsky, Berl, Professor of Criminology: The first law that legalized pornography (Denmark)

History
 

Law
 American judge orders parents to pay $30,441 for disposing adult son's porn collection (27 August 2021). Associated Press.

Sociology
 
 

Technology
 From teledildonics to interactive porn: the future of sex in a digital age (2014-06-06), The Guardian

 
Sexuality